The 1998 Arab Super Cup was an international club competition played by the winners and runners up of the Arab Club Champions Cup and Arab Cup Winners' Cup. It was the fifth edition and was won by Egyptian side Al-Ahly. It was the second time that the host team had not won the championship. Club Africain, the hosts, were runners up.

Teams

Results and standings

References

External links
Arab Super Cup 1998 - rsssf.com

1998
1998
1997–98 in Saudi Arabian football
1997–98 in Tunisian football
1997–98 in Algerian football
1997–98 in Egyptian football